Louise S. Robbins is an American academic and formerly director of the University of Wisconsin–Madison School of Library and Information Studies.

Robbins has won awards for her articles and books dealing with the history of librarians and intellectual freedom in the United States. Her best known work is The Dismissal of Miss Ruth Brown: Civil Rights, Censorship, and the American Library (Norman: University of Oklahoma Press, 2000), winner of the Eliza Atkins Gleason Award and the Willa Literary Award for a nonfiction book from Women Writing the West.

Before moving to Madison, Wisconsin, Robbins was a long-time resident of Ada, Oklahoma, where she became the first female city council person and then the first female mayor.

Robbins was named Wisconsin Librarian of the Year in 2001.

On the occasion of the Oklahoma Library Association Centennial in 2007, she was named one of the state's 100 Library Legends (living or dead).

References

External links
 Oklahoma Library Association Awards
 University of Wisconsin–Madison School of Library and Information Studies.
 Wisconsin Library Association Awards

American librarians
American women librarians
Living people
21st-century American historians
Year of birth missing (living people)
People from Ada, Oklahoma
Mayors of places in Oklahoma
American women historians
Women mayors of places in Oklahoma
Women city councillors in Oklahoma
21st-century American women writers